Ascensión de Guarayos is a town in Bolivia. In 2010 it had an estimated population of 18,816.

The town is served by Ascensión de Guarayos Airport.

References

Populated places in Santa Cruz Department (Bolivia)